, son of Kanetsune, was a kugyō or Japanese court noble of the early Kamakura period. He held a regent position kampaku from 1267 to 1268.  and Iemoto were his sons. One of his daughter was a consort of regent Takatsukasa Kanetada.

References

Fujiwara clan
Konoe family
1246 births
1268 deaths
People of Kamakura-period Japan